Uppsala County is a county or län on the eastern coast of Sweden, whose capital is the city of Uppsala. It borders the counties of Dalarna, Stockholm, Södermanland, Västmanland, Gävleborg, and the Baltic Sea.

Province 
For History, Geography and Culture see: Uppland

The northern parts of the province of Uppland encompasses Uppsala County.

Administration 
The main aim of the County Administrative Board is to fulfil the goals set in national politics by the Riksdag and the Government, to coordinate the interests of the county, promote its development, establish regional goals and safeguard the due process of law in the handling of each case.  The County Administrative Board is a Government Agency headed by a Governor. See List of Uppsala Governors.

Politics 
The County Council of Uppsala or Region Uppsala (previously Landstinget i Uppsala län), which is appointed by the electorate of the county, is primarily responsible for health care and public transportation.

Riksdag elections 
The table details all Riksdag election results of Uppsala County since the unicameral era began in 1970. The blocs denote which party would support the Prime Minister or the lead opposition party towards the end of the elected parliament.

Municipalities 

Älvkarleby
Tierp
Östhammar
Uppsala
Enköping
Håbo
Knivsta
Heby (from 2007-01-01)

Heraldry 
The County of Uppsala inherited its coat of arms from the province of Uppland. When it is shown with a royal crown it represents the County Administrative Board.

References and notes

External links 
Uppsala County Administrative Board
Uppsala County Council
Regional Association of Uppsala
Hotels in Uppsala

 

 
Counties of Sweden
Uppland
1634 establishments in Sweden
States and territories established in 1634